Terminal One or Terminal 1 may refer to:

 Heathrow Terminal 1, a passenger terminal at London Heathrow Airport in England
 Terminal 1 station, various transport stations
Terminal 1 (album), a 2004 album by jazz saxophonist/composer Benny Golson